Identity Unknown is a 1945 American film directed by Walter Colmes.

Plot 
Near the end of World War II in Europe, a soldier suffering from amnesia is on a hospital ship being helped by Major Williams, a medical doctor. The soldier was the only survivor of four infantrymen after German dive bombers destroyed the farm house they were fighting from. When the four men's dog tags were found afterwards, they had been blown off their bodies, and the Army does not know which of the four the surviving soldier is.

The soldier, calling himself Johnny March, tries to discover his true identity. When the hospital ship docks, he decides to visit the homes of the four different soldiers. However, when he jumps off the train on his way to an Army hospital, the Army believes he has deserted.

March looks up the first address on his list in Connecticut, and meets Sally, the widow of that soldier, with whom he becomes romantically involved. Since he was not her husband, March goes on to the next address in West Virginia.

Upon his arrival, a young boy, Toddy, welcomes him and believes his father who has come back. The misunderstanding is cleared up when the boy's babysitter arrives and demands to know who March is. Before he leaves, March tells Toddy how his father died so that children could grow up in a free world.

March then goes on to Chicago, the next address, where he meets that soldier's brother, a younger man named Joe. Joe works in a bookie joint as a cashier. As they talk, a gangster named Rocks Donnelly enters and demands that Joe pay him $6,000. Joe stole the money from Rocks to finance a college education. A rival gangster shows up, and there is a shootout. Joe is wounded taking the bullets meant for Rocks Donnelly. March accompanies Joe to the hospital, and Rocks comes to thank Joe for saving his life. It turns out Joe is not interested in joining the mob, but wants to be a physician, like his brother hoped to be. Donnelly offers to pay for his education. Johnny attends Donnelly's celebration party that same night, and meets Wanda, Donnelly's girlfriend. After talking to March, Wanda realizes March is in love with another woman, and tells Johnny to call Sally and tell her. Sally tells Johnny to find his identity first, and then return to her.

Johnny visits the last address on his list, the home of a soldier who lived on a farm in Iowa, but Peter's parents do not recognize him. They are about to sell their farm, after getting the news that their boy was killed in action. Before they can go through with the sale, March helps them realize the farm is where all their happy memories are, and they stop the auction.

Sally calls, saying she has arrived at a nearby train station, and Johnny hurries over there. On the way, he is caught by the local sheriff for speeding and then by the military police for being AWOL. He is taken by the MPs to the Army hospital, and the Army begin efforts to discover his identity. Later Sally arrives and the doctors tell her that they now know who March really is, but he needs to discover it himself. After asking March a few questions, related to his pre-war career, March remembers he is Captain Charles Aldridge. He was on a mission to try to drop the four men supplies. Charles and Sally leave to start a new life.

Cast 
Richard Arlen as Johnny March
Cheryl Walker as Sally MacGregor
Roger Pryor as Rocks Donnelly
Bobby Driscoll as Toddy Loring
Lola Lane as Wanda
Ian Keith as Major Williams
John Forrest as Joe Granowski
Sarah Padden as Mrs. Anderson
Forrest Taylor as Mr. Anderson
Frank Marlowe as Frankie
Harry Tyler as Harry Parker
Nelson Leigh as Colonel F. A. Marlin
Charles Williams as Auctioneer
Charles Jordan as Needles, Rocks' Henchman
Dick Scott as Spike, Rocks' Henchman
Marjorie Manners as Nurse
Eddie Baker as Motorcycle Cop

Soundtrack

External links

References 

1945 films
1945 drama films
American black-and-white films
American drama films
Films about amnesia
Films set on the home front during World War II
Republic Pictures films
American World War II films
1940s English-language films
1940s American films